Blazing Guns is a 1943 American Western film directed by Robert Emmett Tansey and written by Frances Kavanaugh and Gina Kaus. The film stars Ken Maynard, Hoot Gibson, LeRoy Mason, Emmett Lynn, Weldon Heyburn and Roy Brent. The film was released on October 8, 1943, by Monogram Pictures.

Plot

Cast              
Ken Maynard as Ken Maynard
Hoot Gibson as Hoot Gibson
LeRoy Mason as Duke Wade
Emmett Lynn as Eagle-Eye
Weldon Heyburn as Vic
Roy Brent as Jim Wade
Eddie Gribbon as Cactus Joe
Lloyd Ingraham as Governon Brighton
George Kamel as Weasel 
Cay Forester as Mary Baxter
Robbie Kavanaugh as Virginia
Frank Ellis as Lefty
Charles King as Blackie
Kenne Duncan as Red Higgins 
Dan White as Trigger
Charles Murray Jr. as Mack 
Lee Roberts as Hodge 
John Bridges as Judge Foster

References

External links
 
 Blazing Guns at Turner Classic Movies

1943 films
1940s English-language films
American Western (genre) films
1943 Western (genre) films
Monogram Pictures films
Films directed by Robert Emmett Tansey
American black-and-white films
1940s American films